Halloween Haunt may refer to several Halloween events at Cedar Fair amusement parks:

HalloWeekends (Cedar Point)
Halloween Haunt (California's Great America)(Former)
Halloween Haunt (Canada's Wonderland)
Halloween Haunt (Dorney Park)
Halloween Haunt (Kings Dominion)
Halloween Haunt (Kings Island)
Halloween Haunt (Worlds of Fun)
Knott's Scary Farm
SCarowinds
ValleyScare(Former)